Joplin Sibtain, sometimes credited professionally as Chook Sibtain, is a British actor known for the Netflix series Safe, his seasons at the National Theatre and as Tarak Ital on the Doctor Who special, "The Waters of Mars". He voiced Olin in Horizon Zero Dawn. He won best actor at the New York Movie awards for the title role in Memory Man, and starred as Brasso in the Star Wars television series Andor.

Biography
Joplin Sibtain was born in Waltham Forest, London in 1969. He won a scholarship and attended the Webber Douglas Academy of Dramatic Art. He has performed in theatres including the Royal Shakespeare Company and the National Theatre. He is known for playing various film and television roles including Mickey, opposite Nick Nolte in Head Full Of Honey, Neil Chahal in the Netflix series Safe and Tarak Ital in Doctor Who.

Selected filmography

References

External links

Joplin Sibtain at the British Film Institute

1969 births
Alumni of the Webber Douglas Academy of Dramatic Art
English male film actors
Living people
Male actors from London